Giuliana Morandini (1938 – 22 July 2019) was an Italian writer.

She was born in Udine and lived in Rome and Venezia. Her first book E allora mi hanno rinchiusa: testimonianze dal manicomio femminile (And so I was locked up: Testimony from a Women's Mental Hospital) (1977) was a study of women in Italian mental hospitals; it was a finalist for the Viareggio Prize. Her first novel I cristalli di Vienna was published in 1978 and received the Prato Prize; it was translated in English as Bloodstains. This was followed by Caffè Specchi (The Café of Mirrors) in 1983, which received the Viareggio Prize. Her 1987 novel Angelo a Berlino (Angel in Berlin) was a finalist for the Premio Campiello.

In 1980, she published La voce che è in lei (The voice within her), an anthology of writing by little-known or forgotten Italian women authors. She also wrote an introduction for Italian translations of Samuel Beckett.

Selected works 
 Ricercare Carlotta, children's book (1979)
 Poesie d'amore (Love poems), collected poetry by women (1986)
 Sogno a Herrenberg (Dreams in Herrenberg), historical novel (1991)
 Giocando a dama con la luna (Playing checkers with the moon), historical novel (1996)

References 

1938 births
2019 deaths
20th-century Italian novelists
Italian essayists
Italian women essayists
Viareggio Prize winners
20th-century essayists
20th-century Italian women